Artur Meliashkevich (born April 11, 1975) is a retired male race walker from Belarus. He set his personal best (1:18.12) in the men's 20 km event on March 10, 2001 in Brest, Belarus.

Achievements

See also
Belarusian records in athletics

References

1975 births
Living people
Belarusian male racewalkers
Athletes (track and field) at the 2000 Summer Olympics
Olympic athletes of Belarus